The  will be the tenth season having a fourth-tier status in Japanese football and the 25th season since the establishment of Japan Football League. The matches will continue to be mostly broadcast/streamed live at Japan Football League's channel.

Overview

Promoted from the JFL
In the previous JFL edition, Nara Club were promoted to the J3 League as league champions, while FC Osaka were promoted to the J3 as runners-up. Coincidentally, both clubs are from the Kansai region, and were promoted from the Kansai Soccer League in the same 2014 season, and then debuted in the JFL in 2015. Now both clubs were again promoted together, this time to the J3 League.

Promoted from the Regional Leagues
Okinawa SV and Briobecca Urayasu were respectively, winners and runners-up of the 2022 Regional Champions League, which gives non-league teams the opportunity to be promoted to the JFL. A meeting between the JFL Board of Directors, which was held on 6 December 2022, determined whether the mentioned teams will have its membership accepted. The results were published on the same day at 13:00 (JST).

In case one or both teams failed to meet the requirements needed to play in the JFL, the next team in the order of priority would have joined the JFL, which goes in order from the first-placed team to the last-placed team in the Regional Champions League. In other words, the two best teams amongst those whom the JFL have approved membership could be promoted. Tochigi City FC, the 3rd-placed, and FC Kariya, the 4th-placed of the competition, could still have been promoted under this hypothetical situation. Nevertheless, it didn't needed to be applied, as both Okinawa and Briobecca won promotion and membership approval from the JFL.

Promotion and relegation between J3 and JFL
This season will be the first to feature promotion/relegation between the J3 League and the Japan Football League, enabling the possibility for teams to be relegated from the J3. The system of promotion/relegation between the leagues can be determined by the eligibility (Promotion to J3 requires a J.League license) of the JFL's champions and runners-up for the season.

If only the JFL champions holds a license, there will be automatic promotion/relegation with the J3's 20th-placed team.
If only the JFL runners-up holds a license, there will be promotion/relegation play-offs with the J3's 20th-placed team.
If both the JFL champions and runners-up hold a license, there will be automatic promotion/relegation between the JFL champions and the J3's 20th-placed team, and promotion/relegation play-offs with the J3's 19th-placed team.
If both the JFL champions and runners-up do not hold a license, no promotion/relegation between J3 and JFL will take place.

The dates and the host teams of the promotion/relegation play-off were pre-determined by the J.League. In case it happens: It will be played in two legs on 9 and 16 December, with the J3 team hosting the second leg; away-goals rule will not be applied; should the match be tied, it will require extra-time, and if the draw persists, penalty shoot-outs.

Promotion and relegation between JFL and Regional Leagues
For another season, the league decided to change the promotion/relegation system. The league was "forced" to it due to the withdrawal of FC Kagura Shimane from the JFL. As the club decided to withdraw from the JFL only after the league's schedule was already released, the league season will need to be played with 15 teams. On 23 January 2023, the JFL confirmed the following:

The winner of the 2023 Regional Champions League (JFL promotion series) will be automatically promoted for the 2024 JFL.
The 15th-placed team from the JFL will play a play-off match against the runners-up of the promotion series, with the winner earning a spot at the 2024 JFL.

Further details about the subject, as well as the league schedule, was released by the league on 10 February. The league officially scheduled the 2023 season on that day.

Withdrawal
On 21 September 2022, via their Twitter account, Kagura Shimane announced it was pending payment of about two and a half months' worth of wages for players and staff. Many discussions were made between the JFL Board of Directors and Kagura Shimane's staff and executives. Only on 23 January 2023, after many postponements regarding the final decision over the subject, it was confirmed that Shimane withdrew from the JFL, just a few days after the league schedule was released.

Club name changes
On 27 January 2023, Honda Lock SC and MIO Biwako Shiga officially changed their names to Minebea Mitsumi FC and Reilac Shiga respectively.

Participating clubs
The teams which possess promotion-enabler licenses are highlighted in green in the following table. From 2023, the 100 Year Plan status seems to be no longer required to be given approval for a potential J3 promotion.

Personnel and kits

Managerial changes

Transfers

The official Japanese transfer window opened on 6 January 2023, and is schedule to close on 31 March 2023.

Foreign players

League table

Season statistics
.

Top scorers

Hat-tricks 
All players are yet to score three goals in the same match.

See also

Japan Football Association (JFA)
League
Japanese association football league system
J.League
2023 J1 League (Tier 1)
2023 J2 League (Tier 2)
2023 J3 League (Tier 3)

References

External links
Official website 

Japan Football League seasons
4